The 2013–14 Coastal Carolina Chanticleers men's basketball team represented Coastal Carolina University during the 2013–14 NCAA Division I men's basketball season. The Chanticleers, led by seventh year head coach Cliff Ellis, played their home games at the HTC Center and were members of the South Division of the Big South Conference. They finished the season 21–13, 11–5 in Big South play to be champions of the South Division. They were also champions of the Big South Conference tournament to earn an automatic bid to the NCAA tournament where they lost in the second round to Virginia.

Roster

Schedule

|-
!colspan=9 style="background:#008080; color:#A67D3D;"| Regular season

|-
!colspan=9 style="background:#008080; color:#A67D3D;"| Big South tournament

|-
!colspan=9 style="background:#008080; color:#A67D3D;"| NCAA tournament

References

Coastal Carolina Chanticleers men's basketball seasons
Coastal Carolina
Coastal Carolina